Har cheong gai, is a Singaporean fried chicken dish, consisting of fried chicken wings in a batter with fermented shrimp paste.

Description
Har cheong gai is regarded as one of the most popular family fried chicken dishes in Singapore, and is made with fermented shrimp paste (har cheong) and a host of other spices and ingredients. The shrimp paste used is distinct to the paste used for rojak sauce, but rather a pinkish grey southeastern Chinese style. 

The recipe for har cheong gai differs from other fried chicken recipes in that the marinade and the batter are not separate; rather wheat flour and potato or corn starch is added to the marinade, creating a seasoned batter. Depending on the recipe followed this is done at the very startor just prior to frying after the chicken has been allowed to marinate, in both cases the chicken is often allowed to marinate overnight.

Har cheong gai burger 
A har cheong gai burger is a chicken sandwich from Singapore. It is made up of har cheong gai in a sesame seed bun with salad and mayonnaise.

See also 
 List of chicken dishes
 Taiwan fried chicken
 Crispy fried chicken
 Ayam goreng
 Chicken with chilies
 Korean fried chicken

References

Singaporean cuisine
Chicken dishes
Deep fried foods